Sainte-Marie-de-Blandford is a municipality in the Centre-du-Québec region of the province of Quebec in Canada. It is an area of 69.36 sq ft, and a low population density 6.7 people per sq kilometer as of data recorded in 2016 (more than the overall population density of Quebec which was recorded as 6.0 in 2016). As of 2011, the population was 466 which rose to 468 in 2016. The majority of the population consists of residents 15 through 65, with a relatively balanced proportion of men to women with men taking the lead.

See also
List of municipalities in Quebec

References

External links

Municipalities in Quebec
Incorporated places in Centre-du-Québec